The Reihenwerfer or Mittler Schützenpanzerwagen S307(f) mit Reihenwerfer was a self-propelled barrage mortar used by the Wehrmacht during World War II.

History
After the Fall of France in 1940 large amounts of French military hardware fell into German hands.  Two systems that were captured in sizable numbers were the SOMUA MCG half-track artillery tractor and the 81 mm Brandt Mle 27/31 mortar.  Since the Germans were short of resources both were issued to German units.  The SOMUA MCG was given the German designation S307(f) and the mle 27/31 was given the designation GrW 278(f).            

The Reihenwerfer consisted of 20 GrW 278(f) barrels in two rows of 10 which were mounted on a common framework that was attached to a base mounted on the back of an armored S307(f) chassis.  The mortars and half-tracks were converted by Major Alfred Becker's workshop (Baukommando Becker) in Paris.  All 16 barrels could be traversed 360° and elevated together from +35° to +90°, with the outer barrels pointing slightly outwards to increase the spread of the barrage.  The vehicle carried 90 rounds of ready use ammunition and each barrel held a single round at the top of the tube until fired by pulling a lanyard.  The round then slid down the tube until it hit a firing pin which launched it.  In action, all 16 barrels were fired in rapid succession, but not simultaneously to saturate the target area.  The Reihenwerfer was deployed by German units in Northern France during the Normandy landings.

Gallery

Notes

External links
 http://www.dws-xip.pl/encyklopedia/vehmcg-gr/
 https://www.flamesofwar.com/hobby.aspx?art_id=614

World War II mortars of Germany
World War II self-propelled artillery of Germany
Military vehicles introduced from 1940 to 1944